is a retired Japanese weightlifter and Japan Ground Self-Defense Force Lieutenant. He won one silver and two gold medals at the 1960, 1964 and 1968 Olympics and finished fourth in 1972. He also won world titles in 1962, 1963 and 1965–66. Between 1959 and 1969 Miyake set 25 official world records, including 10 consecutive records in the snatch and nine consecutive records in the total. In 1993 he was inducted into the International Weightlifting Federation Hall of Fame.

Miyake was known for his signature "frog style" or "Miyake pull" lifting technique, in which he kept his heels together with knees spread outward to about 60 degrees with a wide grip on the bar, resembling a frog.

After retiring from competitions Miyake coached the national weightlifting team. His brother  Yoshiyuki Miyake and niece Hiromi Miyake also won Olympic medals in weightlifting. All three were shorter than 1.56 m.

Miyake took part in the opening ceremony of the 2020 Olympics as one of the flagbearers of the flag of Japan.

References

External links 
 

1939 births
Living people
Sportspeople from Miyagi Prefecture
Japan Ground Self-Defense Force personnel
Japanese male weightlifters
Olympic weightlifters of Japan
Weightlifters at the 1960 Summer Olympics
Weightlifters at the 1964 Summer Olympics
Weightlifters at the 1968 Summer Olympics
Weightlifters at the 1972 Summer Olympics
Olympic gold medalists for Japan
Olympic silver medalists for Japan
Olympic medalists in weightlifting
Hosei University alumni
Recipients of the Order of the Sacred Treasure, 4th class
Recipients of the Medal of Honor (Japan)
Asian Games medalists in weightlifting
Weightlifters at the 1966 Asian Games
Medalists at the 1968 Summer Olympics
Medalists at the 1964 Summer Olympics
Medalists at the 1960 Summer Olympics
Asian Games gold medalists for Japan
Medalists at the 1966 Asian Games
World Weightlifting Championships medalists